Mambalam Railway Station is one of the railway stations in Chennai, India, on the Chennai Beach–Chengelpet section of the Chennai Suburban Railway Network. It serves the neighbourhoods of West Mambalam and T. Nagar.

With a patronage of 200,000 passenger a day, Mambalam railway station is one of the busiest stations in the city.

History
Mambalam railway station was constructed when the suburban railway service connecting Madras Egmore with Kanchipuram was opened in 1911. The suburban service between Madras Beach and Tambaram was inaugurated on 11 May 1931 and in this regard, two railway tracks were electrified by 15 November 1931. The section was converted to 25 kV AC traction on 15 January 1967.

Facilities

About nineteen express and passenger trains pass through the station.

Mambalam railway station is one of the busiest stations in the city and handles over 200,000 passenger daily, with more than 1,000 passengers an hour. The parking lot at the station has a capacity to accommodate around 500 to 600 two-wheelers and around 200 bicycles.

The station has a footbridge descending into Ranganathan Street at the southern end of the station. However, following a demand, a second footbridge was built in 2014 at the northern end.

The passenger reservation system (PRS) centre at the station caters to residents of the neighbourhoods including T. Nagar, West Mambalam, Kodambakkam, and Vadapalani. It is a major railway ticket-booking centre after Moore Market Complex and Tambaram. It has ten counters for booking tickets and another counter for enquiries, and sells around 2,500 tickets daily.

Security
The station is covered by the  400-million Integrated Security Surveillance System (ISSS) project implemented in 2012. The project, implemented jointly by the Southern Railways and HCL Infosystems, includes installation of CCTV cameras that would record visuals around the clock and store the data for 30 days, with the footage transmitted and stored using an Internet Protocol system.

See also
 Chennai Suburban Railway
 Railway stations in Chennai

References

External links
Mambalam railway station on Indiarailinfo.org

Stations of Chennai Suburban Railway
Railway stations in Chennai
Railway stations opened in 1911